The Democratic Convergence Party (PCD) is a political party in Guinea-Bissau.

History
The party was formed on 2 August 1991 by Víctor Mandinga. In the 1994 elections it put forward Carlos Gomes Júnior as its candidate as Mandinga was ineligible due to not having both parents born in Guinea-Bissau. In the elections to the National People's Assembly the party received 5.3% of the vote but failed to win a seat.

Prior to the 2004 elections the party joined the United Platform alliance, which failed to win a seat. It contested the 2008 elections as part of the Democratic Alliance, which won a single seat. The party ran alone in the 2014 parliamentary elections, winning two seats.

References

Political parties in Guinea-Bissau
Political parties established in 1991
1991 establishments in Guinea-Bissau